Sam Ellis (born September 19, 1987) is a Canadian songwriter and record producer based in Nashville, Tennessee.

Biography
In 2012, Ellis signed to Universal Music Publishing Group. He co-wrote Martina McBride's single "Just Around the Corner" which became the official anthem for the 'Band Against Cancer: The Sarah Cannan Tour'. "Somewhere In the Country", co-written and produced with Canadian country music artist Tebey, peaked at #11 on the Canadian Radio Airplay chart and was the most played Canadian country song on country radio in 2012. His songwriting credits also include cuts with Thomas Rhett, Jacob Sartorius, Hearts & Colors, Hunter Hayes, Kane Brown, and Martina McBride.

Songwriting credits
Songs written or co-written by Sam Ellis.

Production credits

Sync credits

References

1987 births
Living people
Canadian country songwriters
Musicians from Ontario
Canadian record producers
Canadian male singer-songwriters
Canadian singer-songwriters
21st-century Canadian male singers